The Tallahassee Jewels were an expansion team of the Women's Football Alliance that began play in 2012.  Based in Tallahassee, Florida, the Jewels played their home games on the campus of Godby High School.

Season-By-Season

|-
|2012* || 4 || 1 || 0 || 1st WFA National 8 || --

* = current standing

2012

Season schedule

External links 
 

Women's Football Alliance teams
Sports in Tallahassee, Florida
American football teams in Florida
American football teams established in 2012
2012 establishments in Florida
Women's sports in Florida